This is the discography of British hardcore punk band Anti-Nowhere League.

Albums

Studio albums

Live albums

Compilation albums

Video albums

EPs

Singles

References

Discographies of British artists
Punk rock discographies